High-speed multimedia radio (HSMM) is the implementation of high-speed wireless TCP/IP data networks over amateur radio frequency allocations using commercial off-the-shelf (COTS) hardware such as 802.11 Wi-Fi access points. This is possible because the 802.11 unlicensed frequency bands partially overlap with amateur radio bands and ISM bands in many countries. Only licensed amateur radio operators may legally use amplifiers and high-gain antennas within amateur radio frequencies to increase the power and coverage of an 802.11 signal.

Basics 

The idea behind this implementation is to modify commercial 802.11 equipment for use on licensed Amateur Radio frequencies. The main frequency bands being used for these networks are: 900 MHz (33 cm), 2.4 GHz (13 cm), 3.4 GHz (9 cm), and 5.8 GHz (5 cm). Since the unlicensed 802.11 or Wi-Fi frequency bands overlap with amateur frequencies, only custom firmware is needed to access these licensed frequencies.
Such networks can be used for emergency communications for disaster relief operations as well as in everyday amateur radio communications (hobby/social).

Capabilities 
HSMM can support most of the traffic that the Internet currently does, including video chat, voice, instant messaging, email, the Web (HTTP), file transfer (FTP), and forums. The only differences being that with HSMM, such services are community instead of commercially implemented and it is mostly wireless. HSMM can even be connected to the Internet and used for web surfing, although because of the FCC regulations on permitted content, this is done only when directly used for ham radio activities (under Part 97). Using high gain directional antennas and amplifiers, reliable long-distance wireless links over many miles are possible and only limited by propagation and the radio horizon.

Bandwidths and Speeds 
HSMM networks most-often use professional hardware with narrower channel bandwidths such as 5 or 10 MHz to help increase range. It is common for networks to use channel -2 with a 5 MHz bandwidth. For long-range links extending outside of metropolitan areas 802.11b DSSS modulations or 802.11ah (900 MHz) equipment can be used, further increasing range at the cost of speed.

- DSSS is 10 watts max PEP in USA

- DSSS is 10 watts max PEP in USA

US / FCC Frequencies and channels 
The following is a list of the 802.11 channels that overlap into an amateur radio band under the FCC in the United States. Note that the 5 cm amateur band extends from 5.65 to 5.925 GHz, so that there are many frequencies outside the Part 15 ISM/UNII block used for 802.11a. Many commercial grade 802.11a access points can also operate in between the normal channels by using 5 MHz channel spacing instead of the standard 20 MHz channel spacing. 802.11a channels 132, 136 and 140 are only available for unlicensed use in ETSI regions. Channels and frequencies marked in  should not be used.

* must use 5/10Mhz bandwidth

Acronyms Used: (amateur radio)  (ISM)  (Radar)

Channels and power

FCC / United States

802.11a 
The 802.11a amateur radio band consists of 30 overlapping channels in the 5.650–5.925 GHz (5 cm) band. The 802.11a standard uses OFDM or "Orthogonal Frequency Division Multiplexing" to transmit data and therefore is not classified as spread-spectrum. Because of this 802.11a hardware is not subject to the power rules in FCC Part 97 § 97.311 and the maximum allowable output power is 1,500 watts (W) PEP.

802.11b 
The 802.11b amateur radio band consists of 8 overlapping channels in the 2.390–2.450 GHz (13 cm) band. The 802.11b specification uses Direct Sequence Spread Spectrum (DSSS) to transmit data and is subject to the rules of FCC Part 97 § 97.311. Therefore, the maximum allowable power output in the USA is 10 W PEP.

802.11g 
The 802.11g amateur radio band consists of 8 overlapping channels in the 2.4 GHz (13 cm) band. The 802.11g standard uses OFDM or "Orthogonal Frequency Division Multiplexing" to transmit data and therefore is not classified as spread-spectrum. Because of this 802.11g hardware is not subject to the power rules in FCC Part 97 § 97.311 and the maximum allowable output power is 1,500 W PEP.

802.11n 
The 802.11n amateur radio band consists of 8 overlapping channels in the 2.4 GHz (13 cm) band. The 802.11n standard uses OFDM or "Orthogonal Frequency Division Multiplexing" to transmit data and therefore is not classified as spread-spectrum. Because of this 802.11n hardware is not subject to the power rules in FCC Part 97 § 97.311 and the maximum allowable output power is 1,500 W PEP.

802.11y 
The 802.11y amateur radio band consists of 24 overlapping channels in the 3.4 GHz (9 cm) band. The 802.11y standard uses OFDM or "Orthogonal Frequency Division Multiplexing" to transmit data and therefore is not classified as spread-spectrum. Because of this 802.11y hardware is not subject to the power rules in FCC Part 97 § 97.311 and the maximum allowable output power is 1,500 W PEP.

Frequency sharing

FCC / United States

802.11a 
The 5 cm band is shared with the fixed-satellite service in ITU Region 1, and the radiolocation service. In ITU Region 2 (US) the primary user is military radiolocation, specifically naval radar. Amateur radio operators have secondary privileges to the Federal radiolocation service in the entire band and may not cause interference to these users. Amateur operators are allocated this band are in a co-secondary basis with ISM devices and space research. Amateur, space research, and ISM operators each have the "right to operate". Due to the lack of a high number of Part 15 users (compared to 2.4 GHz), the noise level tends to be lower in many parts of the US but can be quite congested in urban centers and on mountaintops. The frequencies from 5.6-5.65 GHz (channel 132) should generally be avoided to prevent interfering with TDWR weather radar stations.

802.11b/g/n 
The 13 cm band is shared with Part 15 users as well as the Federal radiolocation service, and ISM (industrial, scientific, medical) devices. Amateur radio operators have secondary privileges to the Federal radiolocation service in the entire band and may not cause interference to these users. Amateur radio operators have primary privileges to ISM devices from 2.390–2.417 GHz and secondary privileges from 2.417–2.450 GHz. Because of the high number of Part 15 users, the noise level in this band tends to be rather high.

802.11y 
The 9 cm band is shared with fixed services and space-to-Earth communications. Amateur radio operators using this band may not cause interference to other licensed users, including government radar stations. The low number of users tends to make this band quiet.

Identification 
As with any amateur radio mode, stations must identify at least once every 10 minutes. One acceptable method for doing so is to transmit one's call sign inside an ICMP echo request (commonly known as a ping). If the access point is set to "master" then the user's call sign may be set as the "SSID" and therefore will be transmitted at regular intervals.

It is also possible to use a DDNS "push" request to automatically send an amateur call sign in plain text (ASCII) every 10 minutes. This requires that a computer's hostname be set to the call sign of the amateur operator and that the DHCP servers lease time be set to less than or equal to 10 minutes. With this method implemented the computer will send a DNS "push" request that includes the local computers hostname every time the DHCP lease is renewed. This method is supported by all modern operating systems including but not limited to Windows, Mac OS X, BSD, and Linux.

802.11 hardware may transmit and receive the entire time it is powered on even if the user is not sending data.

Security 
Because the meaning of amateur transmissions may not be obscured, security measures that are implemented must be published. This does not necessarily restrict authentication or login schemes, but it does restrict fully encrypted communications. This leaves the communications vulnerable to various attacks once the authentication has been completed. This makes it very difficult to keep unauthorized users from accessing HSMM networks, although casual eavesdroppers can effectively be deterred. Current schemes include using MAC address filtering, WEP and WPA/WPA2. MAC address filtering and WEP are all hackable by using freely available software from the Internet, making them the less secure options. Per FCC rules the encryption keys themselves must be published in a publicly accessible place if using WEP, WPA/WPA2 or any other encryption, thereby undermining the security of their implementation. Such measures however are effective against casual or accidental wireless intrusions.

Using professional or modified hardware it is possible to operate on 802.11a channels that are outside the FCC authorized Part 15 bands but still inside the 5.8 GHz (5 cm) or 2.4 GHz (13 cm) amateur radio bands. Transverters or "frequency converters" can also be used to move HSMM 802.11b/g/n operations from the 2.4 GHz (13 cm) band to the 3.4 GHz (9 cm) amateur radio band. Such relocation provides a measure of security by operating outside the channels available to unlicensed (Part 15) 802.11 devices.

Custom frequencies 
Using amateur-only frequencies provide better security and interference characteristics to amateur radio operators. In the past it used to be easy to use modified consumer grade hardware to operate 802.11 on channels that are outside of the normal FCC allocated frequencies for unlicensed users but still inside an amateur radio band. However, regulatory concerns with the non-authorized use of licensed band frequencies is making it harder. The newer Linux drivers implement Custom Regulatory Database that prevents a casual user from operating outside of the country-specific operating bands. This requires the use of radio transceivers based on the use of Transverter (or frequency converter) technology.

420 MHz 
Doodle Labs is a privately held manufacturing company with headquarters in Singapore that designs and manufactures a line of long range Wireless Data Transceiver devices.

The DL-435 is mini-PCI adapter based on the Atheros wireless chipset.

XAGYL Communications is a Canadian Distributor of Ultra High-Speed, Long Range Wireless equipment.

The XAGYL Communications XC420M is a mini-PCI adapter based on the Atheros wireless chipset.

The Atheros chipset's ability to use 5 MHz transmission bandwidths could allow part 97 operation on the 420–430 MHz ATV sub-band. (Note that 420–430 MHz operation is not allowed near the Canada–US border. Refer to the "Line A" rule.)

900 MHz 
Transverters as well as using older 802.11 hardware such as the original NRC WaveLan or FHSS modems made by Aerocomm and FreeWave make it possible to operate on this band. Ubiquiti M9-series also provide hardware capable in this band.  Beware that noise floor on this band in the larger cities is  usually very high, which severely limits receiver performance.

2.4 GHz custom frequencies 
Using professional grade hardware or modified consumer grade hardware it is possible to operate on 802.11b/g hardware on channels that are effectively: "−1" at 2.402 GHz, and "−2" at 2.397 GHz.  Using these channels allows amateur operators to move away from unlicensed Part 15 operators but may interfere with amateur radio satellite downlinks near 2.400 GHz and 2.401 GHz.

3.3–3.8 GHz 
Frequency conversion involves the use of transverters that convert the operating frequency of the 802.11b/g device from 2.4 GHz to another band entirely. Transverter is a technical term and is rarely used to describe these products which are more commonly known as frequency converters, up/down converters, and just converters. Commercially available converters can convert a 2.4 GHz 802.11b/g signal to the 3.4 GHz (9 cm) band which is not authorized for unlicensed Part 15 users.

Ubiquiti Networks has four radios based on Atheros chipsets with transverters on board for this band.  The PowerBridge M3 and M365 for 3.5 GHz and 3.65 GHz respectively for aesthetically low profile PtP (Point-to-Point) connections.  The Nanostation M3 and M365 are in a molded weatherproof case with 13.7 dBi dual polarization antennas. The Rocket M3, M365 and M365 GPS are in a rugged case using a hi-power, very linear 2x2 MIMO radio with 2x RP-SMA (Waterproof) connectors.  Finally the NanoBridge M3 and M365 for long range PtP connections.  These devices use N mode Atheros chipsets along with Ubiquiti's airMax TDMA protocol to overcome the hidden node problem which is commonly an issue when using ptmp wireless outdoors. UBNT currently does not allow sales to U.S. Amateurs and only sell these radios under FCC License.  This may be due to exclusion areas near coasts and US Navy installations.  The 3.5 GHz band is currently used for DoD or Navy (shipborne and ground-based) radar operations and covers 60 percent of the U.S. population.  This however may change due to a recent FCC NPRM & Order.

5.8 GHz custom frequencies 
Using professional grade hardware or modified consumer grade hardware it is possible to operate on 802.11a channels 116–140 (5.57–5.71 GHz) and channels above 165 (> 5.835 GHz). These frequencies are outside of the FCC-allocated Part 15 unlicensed band, but still inside of the 5.8 GHz (5 cm) amateur radio band. Modifying consumer hardware to operate on these expanded channels often involves installing after-market firmware and/or changing the "country code" setting of the wireless card. When buying professional grade hardware, many companies will authorize the use of these expanded frequencies for a small additional fee.

Custom firmware 

One popular way to access amateur-only frequencies is to modify an off-the-shelf access point with custom firmware. This custom firmware is freely available on the Internet from projects such as DD-WRT and OpenWrt.  The AREDN Project supports off-the-shelf firmware that supports Part-97-only frequencies on Ubiquiti and TP-Link hardware.  A popular piece of hardware that is modified is the Linksys WRT54GL because of the widespread availability of both the hardware and third-party firmware, however, the Linksys hardware is not frequency agile due to the closed nature of the Linksys drivers.

See also 
Map of AREDN network HSMM nodes
Amateur radio emergency communications
Amateur radio frequency allocations
AMPRNet
DD-WRT
Metropolitan Area Network
Orthogonal frequency-division multiplexing
Packet Radio
Spread spectrum
Tomato Firmware
Ultra wideband
Wireless Distribution System
Wireless LAN
List of HSMM nodes

References

External links 
 FCC Part 97 Rules
 FCC Part 15 Rules
 FCC rejection of OFDM as Spread Spectrum
 Using Part 15 Wireless Ethernet Devices For Amateur Radio
 5.0 GHz (802.11a/h) Channels and Frequencies
BROADBAND-HAMNET.ORG Wireless Mesh: The award-winning Broadband-Hamnet – A project started in Austin, TX but has become the Ham Broadband standard worldwide, to create broadband-speed (>1 Mbit/s) mesh networks for Ham Radio use.
 AREDN – Amateur Radio Emergency Data Network: This project picks up where Broadband-Hamnet leaves off and advances the Open Source software to widely available commercial devices and expands the technology beyond 2.4 GHz to the 900 MHz, 3.4 GHz, and 5.7 GHz ham bands.
 Enabling Innovative Small Cell Use In 3.5 GHZ Band NPRM & Order

Packet radio